Valuyeh-ye Sofla (also Romanized as Valūyeh-ye Soflá; also known as Valūyeh-ye Pā’īn, Volūyeh, and Volūyeh Pā’īn) is a village in Poshtkuh Rural District, Chahardangeh District, Sari County, Mazandaran Province, Iran. At the 2006 census, its population was 80, in 24 families.

References 

Populated places in Sari County